Jane Casey is an Irish-born author of crime novels.  She was born in Dublin in 1977 and grew up in Castleknock, 8 km (5 mi) west of the centre of Dublin. She studied English at Jesus College, Oxford.

Her first book, The Missing, was published by Ebury Press in February 2010. It was shortlisted for the Ireland AM Crime Fiction Award. She then began a series of novels featuring Detective Constable Maeve Kerrigan: The Burning, The Reckoning, The Last Girl, The Stranger You Know and The Kill (which was shortlisted for the Ireland AM Crime Fiction Award 2014). She has also begun a series of novels for young adults, featuring her character Jess Tennant: How to Fall, Bet Your Life and Hide and Seek.

Publications

Standalone Novels

Jess Tennant series

Maeve Kerrigan series 
 
 
 
  short story
 
 
 
 
  short story
 
  short story
 
  short story

External links

References 

1977 births
Writers from Dublin (city)
Alumni of Jesus College, Oxford
Crime novelists
Irish crime fiction writers
Edgar Award winners
Living people